Kanyawee Songmuang (born 21 July 1996), nicknamed Thanaerng, is a Thai actress. She is best known for her lead roles in the television drama Hormones 3 (2015) and Senior Secret Love: My Lil Boy (2016).

Early life and education
Kanyawee Songmuang was born on 21 July 1996 in Roi Et Province, Thailand. She is of Thai-Chinese descent. Currently, she is a student at the College of Interdisciplinary Studies, Thammasat University, where she takes a PPE program.

Career
She started her entertainment career by joining Miss Teen Thailand in 2012 and Thailand Super Model in 2013. In 2014, she participated in Hormones: The Next Gen and finished up in Top 6. She then starred in Hormones Season 2 as Jane. In the same year she acted in the 10th episode of ThirTEEN Terrors as Thitima. In 2015 she reprised her role as Jane in Hormones: The Final Season. In 2016, she acted with Korapat Kirdpan in Senior Secret Love as Belle.

Filmography

Drama

References

External links

1996 births
Living people
Kanyawee Songmuang
Kanyawee Songmuang
Kanyawee Songmuang
Kanyawee Songmuang
Kanyawee Songmuang
Kanyawee Songmuang
Kanyawee Songmuang
Kanyawee Songmuang